Tareq Bakari (born 1988) is a Moroccan writer. He was born in Missour in eastern Morocco, and studied Arabic literature at Sidi Mohamed Ben Abdellah University in Fes. His debut novel Numedia (2015) was nominated for the Arabic Booker Prize. He works as an Arabic language teacher in Meknes.

References

Moroccan writers
Living people
1988 births
People from Missour
Date of birth missing (living people)
Sidi Mohamed Ben Abdellah University alumni